777 Gutemberga (prov. designation:  or ) is a dark and large background asteroid, approximately  in diameter, from the outer regions of the asteroid belt. It was discovered by German astronomer Franz Kaiser at the Heidelberg-Königstuhl State Observatory on 24 January 1914. The carbonaceous C-type asteroid (Cb) has a rotation period of 12.8 hours. It was named after Johannes Gutenberg (ca. 1400–1468), who introduced the printing press to Europe and started the Printing Revolution.

Orbit and classification 

Gutemberga is a non-family asteroid of the main belt's background population when applying the hierarchical clustering method to its proper orbital elements. It orbits the Sun in the outer asteroid belt at a distance of 2.9–3.6 AU once every 5 years and 10 months (2,119 days; semi-major axis of 3.23 AU). Its orbit has an eccentricity of 0.11 and an inclination of 13° with respect to the ecliptic. The body's observation arc begins at Heidelberg on 22 December 1924, almost 11 years after its official discovery observation.

Naming 

This minor planet was named after Johannes Gutenberg (ca. 1400–1468), a German inventor who started the Printing Revolution with the introduction of mechanical movable type printing. Gutenberg lived and died in Mainz and the neighboring Eltville am Rhein. The  was mentioned in The Names of the Minor Planets by Paul Herget in 1955. The crater Gutenberg on the Moon and the feature Rimae Gutenberg, a 223-kilometer long groove near the crater, were also named after him.

Physical characteristics 

In the Tholen-like taxonomy of the Small Solar System Objects Spectroscopic Survey (S3OS2), Gutemberga is a common, carbonaceous C-type asteroid. In the Bus–Binzel SMASS-like taxonomic variant of the S3OS2, it is a Cb-subtype, which transitions from the C-type to the somewhat brighter B-type asteroid.

Rotation period 

In January 218, a rotational lightcurve of Gutemberga was obtained from photometric observations by Tom Polakis at the Command Module Observatory  in Arizona. Lightcurve analysis gave a well-defined rotation period of  hours with a brightness variation of  magnitude.

The result supersedes observations by Otmar Nickel of Astronomical Consortium of Mainz from February 2001, which gave a period of  hours with an amplitude of  magnitude, and observations by Astronomers at the Palomar Transient Factory in California, with a period of  hours and an amplitude of  magnitude.().

Diameter and albedo 

The Collaborative Asteroid Lightcurve Link derives an albedo of 0.0494 and a diameter of 65.57 kilometers based on an absolute magnitude of 9.8. These timed observations are taken when the asteroid passes in front of a distant star.

Notes

References

External links 
 Wie schnell dreht sich Gutenberg im All? ( 777 Gutemberga), Otmar Nickel, Astronomical Consortium of Mainz (AAG Mainz) 
 Lightcurve Database Query (LCDB), at www.minorplanet.info
 Dictionary of Minor Planet Names, Google books
 Asteroids and comets rotation curves, CdR – Geneva Observatory, Raoul Behrend
 Discovery Circumstances: Numbered Minor Planets (1)-(5000) – Minor Planet Center
 
 

000777
Discoveries by Franz Kaiser
Named minor planets
19140124